The Three Hills Thrashers are a junior B ice hockey team based in Three Hills, Alberta, Canada. They are members of the North Division of the Heritage Junior B Hockey League (HJHL). They play their home games at Three Hills Centennial Place.

The Thrashers hosted the 2008 Provincial Championships and finished with a silver medal.

The Thrashers took a one year leave of absence from the Heritage Junior Hockey League, for the 2019-2020 season.

In early 2020, a new group went to work to save the franchise, and successfully endeavoured to return to active status for the 2020-2021 season.

Season-by-season record  
Note: GP = Games played, W = Wins, L = Losses, T = Ties, OTL = Overtime Losses, Pts = Points, GF = Goals for, GA = Goals against, PIM = Penalties in minutes

Russ Barnes Trophy
Alberta Jr. B Provincial Championships

NHL alumni  
Kevin Haller

See also  
List of ice hockey teams in Alberta

External links  
Official website of the Three Hills Thrashers

Ice hockey teams in Alberta
2000 establishments in Alberta
Ice hockey clubs established in 2000